Colquhoun Peak is a  mountain summit located in the southeast corner of King County in Washington state. It is set on land managed by Mount Baker-Snoqualmie National Forest. Precipitation runoff from Colquhoun Peak drains into tributaries of the Greenwater River. It once hosted a fire lookout tower.

History
This geographical feature's "Colquhoun Peak" name was officially adopted in 1932 by the U.S. Board on Geographic Names. It has also been known as Colquhoun Mountain and Jacknife Peak. The peak's name was suggested by the White River Recreation Association to honor member Carl Colquhoun who died in 1931 while packing to this peak.

Climate
Colquhoun Peak is located in the marine west coast climate zone of western North America. Most weather fronts originate in the Pacific Ocean, and travel northeast toward the Cascade Mountains. As fronts approach, they are forced upward by the peaks of the Cascade Range (Orographic lift), causing them to drop their moisture in the form of rain or snowfall onto the Cascades. As a result, the west side of the Cascades experiences high precipitation, especially during the winter months in the form of snowfall. During winter months, weather is usually cloudy, but due to high pressure systems over the Pacific Ocean that intensify during summer months, there is often little or no cloud cover during the summer.

See also

 Geology of the Pacific Northwest

References

External links
 Weather forecast: Colquhoun Peak
 Colquhoun Peak Trail 1195: US Forest Service
 Colquhoun pronunciation

Cascade Range
Mountains of King County, Washington
Mountains of Washington (state)
North American 1000 m summits
Mount Baker-Snoqualmie National Forest